Bedford Island is an island about  long, lying at the south end of the Barcroft Islands in the Biscoe Islands, 700 m south of Chakarov Island. It was mapped from air photos taken by the Falkland Islands and Dependencies Aerial Survey Expedition (1956–57), and named by the UK Antarctic Place-Names Committee for Thomas Bedford, an English physicist who specialized in the measurement of the physical environment of man.

See also 
 List of Antarctic and sub-Antarctic islands

References 

Islands of the Biscoe Islands